The foreign relations of Ghana are controlled by the Ministry of Foreign Affairs of Ghana. Ghana is active in the United Nations and many of its specialised agencies, the World Trade Organization, the Non-Aligned Movement, the Organisation of African Unity (OAU), the African Union (AU) and the Economic Community of West African States. Generally, it follows the consensus of the Non-aligned Movement and the OAU on economic and political issues not directly affecting its own interests. Ghana has been extremely active in international peacekeeping activities under UN auspices in Lebanon, Afghanistan, Rwanda, and the Balkans, in addition to an eight-year sub-regional initiative with its ECOWAS partners to develop and then enforce a cease-fire in Liberia. Ghana is also a member of the International Criminal Court.

Guiding principles and objectives
Ghana's foreign policy since independence has been characterised by a commitment to the principles and ideals of non-alignment and Pan-Africanism as first enunciated by Kwame Nkrumah in the early 1960s. For Nkrumah, non-alignment meant complete independence from the policies and alliances of both East and West and support for a worldwide union of so-called non-aligned nations as a counter to both East and West power blocs. Pan-Africanism, by contrast, was a specifically African policy that envisioned the independence of Africa from Western colonialism and the eventual economic and political unity of the African continent.[1]

The PNDC, like most of its predecessors, made serious and consistent attempts at the practical application of these ideals and principles, and its successor, the NDC government, promises to follow in the PNDC's footsteps. Under the NDC, Ghana remains committed to the principle of non-alignment in world politics. Ghana is also opposed to interference in the internal affairs of both small and large countries. This is a departure from Nkrumah's foreign policy approach; Nkrumah was frequently accused of subverting African regimes, such as Togo and Ivory Coast, which he considered ideologically conservative. The NDC government, like the PNDC before it, believes in the principle of self-determination, including the right to political independence and the right of people to pursue their economic and social development free from external interference. Another feature of NDC rule carried over from the PNDC era is faithfulness to what a leading scholar of Africa has called "one of the most successful neoclassical economic reform efforts supported by the IMF and the World Bank."

The broad objectives of Ghana's foreign policy thus include maintaining friendly relations and cooperation with all countries that desire such cooperation, irrespective of ideological considerations, on the basis of mutual respect and non-interference in each other's internal affairs. Africa and its liberation and unity are naturally the cornerstones of Ghana's foreign policy. As a founding member of the Organisation of African Unity (OAU), NDC policy is to adhere faithfully to the OAU Charter.

Another important principle of Ghana's foreign policy involves the closest possible cooperation with neighbouring countries with which the people of Ghana share cultural history, ties of blood, and economics. The results have included various bilateral trade and economic agreements and permanent joint commissions involving Ghana and its immediate neighbours, sometimes in the face of latent ideological and political differences and mutual suspicion, as well as numerous reciprocal state visits by high-ranking officials. These measures have contributed significantly to subregional cooperation, development, and the reduction of tension.

As an example of Ghana's interest in regional cooperation, the country enthusiastically endorsed formation of the Economic Community of West African States (ECOWAS) in 1975. This organisation was created specifically to foster inter-regional economic and political cooperation. It has served as a useful vehicle for contacts with neighbouring West African governments and for channelling increased Ghanaian exports to regional markets. Since 1990 ECOWAS has been engaged in a peacekeeping mission in Liberia to which Ghana has contributed a large contingent of troops. Ghana has participated in other international peacekeeping efforts as well, sending soldiers to operations of the United Nations (UN) in Cambodia in 1992-93 and Rwanda in 1993-94.

In August 1994, Rawlings became ECOWAS chairman, a post that had eluded him since the PNDC came to power. He immediately undertook several initiatives to reduce tensions and conflict in West Africa. Notable among them was the Akosombo Accord of September 12, designed to end civil war in Liberia.

Bilateral relations

Africa

Americas

Asia

Europe

Oceania

Ghana and the Commonwealth of Nations

Ghana has been a member state of the Commonwealth since independence in 1957, firstly as a Dominion, then as a republic in the Commonwealth of Nations.

See also

Visa policy of Ghana
Minister for Foreign Affairs (Ghana)
List of diplomatic missions in Ghana
List of diplomatic missions of Ghana
List of Ambassadors and High Commissioners of Ghana

References

External links 
 

 
Ghana and the Commonwealth of Nations